Termes is a former commune in the Ardennes department in northern France. On 1 January 2016, it was merged into the commune Grandpré.

Population

See also
Communes of the Ardennes department

References

Former communes of Ardennes (department)
Ardennes communes articles needing translation from French Wikipedia
Populated places disestablished in 2016